{{Infobox CBB Team
|women=yes
|name = West Virginia Mountaineers
|current = 2022–23 West Virginia Mountaineers women's basketball team
|logo = West Virginia Mountaineers logo.svg
|logo_size = 175
|university = West Virginia University
|conference = Big 12
|location = Morgantown, West Virginia
|coach = Vacant
|tenure = 
|arena = WVU Coliseum
|capacity = 14,000
|nickname = Mountaineers
|h_body= 002855
|h_pattern_b=_thinsidesonwhite
|h_shorts= 002855
|h_pattern_s=_blanksides2
|a_body= 002855
|a_pattern_b=_thingoldsides
|a_shorts= 002855
|a_pattern_s=_thingoldsides
|3_body=EAAA00
|3_pattern_b=_thinbluesides
|3_shorts=EAAA00
|3_pattern_s=_bluesides
|NCAAchampion = 
|NCAArunnerup =
|NCAAfinalfour =
|NCAAeliteeight =
|NCAAsweetsixteen = 1992
|NCAAsecondround =  1989, 1992, 2007, 2008, 2010, 2011, 2012, 2014, 2016, 2017, 2021
|NCAAtourneys = 1989, 1992, 2004, 2007, 2008, 2010, 2011, 2012, 2013, 2014, 2016, 2017, 2021, 2023
|NITchampionships =
|conference_tournament = A-101989

'Big 122017
|conference_season = A-101992

Big 122014''
}}

The West Virginia Mountaineers women's basketball team represents West Virginia University in NCAA Division I college basketball competition. They are a member of the Big 12 Conference. West Virginia has earned twelve bids to the NCAA Division I women's basketball tournament. In 2017, they won the  Big 12 Tournament, despite finishing sixth in the regular season.

History
The first women's basketball team was started in 1973, as a result of the Title IX mandates. The first coach was Kittie Blakemore, who was asked to create a schedule against ten local teams. The first year, the team played 14 games, winning four. The team improved the next year, winning 13 of their 17 games. Blakemore would remain as head coach for 19 seasons, leading the team to a conference tournament championship in the A10 in 1989, and a first-place finish in the regular season in her final season, 1992.

Notable figures
 Yelena Leuchanka
 Cathy Parson
 Olayinka Sanni
 Georgeann Wells

Head coaches
 Kittie Blakemore (1973–1992)
 Bill Fiske (1984–1987)
 Scott Harrelson (1987–1996)
 Susan Walvius (1996–1998)
 Alexis Basil (1998–2001)
 Mike Carey (2001–2022)
 Dawn Plitzuweit (2022–2023)

2020–21 Roster

School records
Source

Career leaders
Points Scored: Cathy Parson (2,115)
Rebounds: Olivia Bradley (1,484)
Assists: Yolanda Paige (902)
Steals: Talisha Hargis (355)
Games Played: Teana Muldrow (143)
Games Started: Aysa Bussie (138)
Double-Doubles: Olivia Bradley (68)
30-point Games: Rosemary Kosiorek (6)
3-pointers: Kate Bulger (302)

Single-season leaders
Points Scored: Rosemary Kosiorek (730, 1992)
Rebounds: Olivia Bradley, (458, 1985)
Assists: Yolanda Paige (297, 2005)
Steals: Jenny Hillen (114, 1989)
Double-Doubles: Georgeann Wells (22, 1986)
30-point Games: Meg Bulger (5, 2005)

Year by year results
Source

|-style="background: #ffffdd;"
| colspan="8" align="center" | Atlantic 10 Conference|-style="background: #ffffdd;"
| colspan="8" align="center" | Big East Conference (1979–2012)|-style="background: #ffffdd;"
| colspan="8" align="center" | Big 12 Conference (2012–present)'''

NCAA tournament results

See also
 West Virginia Mountaineers men's basketball

References

External links